Charles MacArthur (December 27, 1920 – February 24, 2010) was a Canadian politician. He represented the electoral districts of Inverness North and Inverness in the Nova Scotia House of Assembly from 1988 to 1998. He was a member of the Nova Scotia Liberal Party.

Born in 1920 at Inverness, Nova Scotia, MacArthur was a municipal councillor for 18 years and served as Warden of Inverness County. He entered provincial politics in the 1988 election, defeating Progressive Conservative incumbent Jim MacLean by 801 votes in the Inverness North riding. In 1993, MacArthur defeated Inverness South MLA Danny Graham for the Liberal nomination in the re-established Inverness riding, after their ridings were eliminated through redistribution. In the 1993 election, MacArthur was re-elected, defeating his closest opponent by 2860 votes. He did not reoffer in the 1998 election. MacArthur died in Inverness on February 24, 2010.

References

1920 births
2010 deaths
Nova Scotia Liberal Party MLAs
People from Inverness County, Nova Scotia
Nova Scotia municipal councillors